The Best European Goalkeeper award is a football award given annually since 1990 to the most outstanding Goalkeeper in Europe, as voted by the UEFA magazine, in 2009 the ESM become the donor of the award.

From 1998 to 2009 the Best European Goalkeeper was awarded to the same goalkeepers that won the Best Goalkeeper within the UEFA Club Football Awards.

List of winners

1990 –  Walter Zenga
1991 –  Bodo Illgner 
1992 –  Peter Schmeichel  
1993 –  Peter Schmeichel 
1994 –  Michel Preud'homme 
1995 –  Edwin van der Sar 
1996 –  Andreas Köpke  
1997 –  Jens Lehmann 
1998 –  Peter Schmeichel 
1999 –  Oliver Kahn
2000 –  Oliver Kahn  
2001 –  Oliver Kahn 
2002 –  Oliver Kahn 
2003 –  Gianluigi Buffon 
2004 –  Vítor Baía 
2005 –  Petr Čech 
2006 –  Jens Lehmann 
2007 –  Petr Čech 
2008 –  Petr Čech  
2009 –  Edwin van der Sar 
2010 –  Iker Casillas
2011 –  Manuel Neuer
2012 –  Petr Čech 
2013 –  Manuel Neuer 
2014 –  Manuel Neuer 
2015 –  Manuel Neuer
2016 –  Gianluigi Buffon
2017 –  Gianluigi Buffon
2018 –  Keylor Navas
2019 –  Alisson Becker
2020 –  Manuel Neuer
2021 –  Édouard Mendy

Wins by country

Wins by club

See also
IFFHS World's Best Goalkeeper
The Best FIFA Goalkeeper
UEFA Best Club Goalkeeper Award

References

Goalkeeper
Association football goalkeeper awards
Association football player non-biographical articles